Roger Barlet (nom de guerre Rożek; 12 April 1914, Metz – 29 or 30 August 1944, Warsaw) was a French soldier.

Born in Metz, after the Battle of France he was conscripted to the German Wehrmacht and dispatched to the East Front. However, he deserted and joined the ranks of the Polish Home Army in the rank of a Corporal. Serving in the III platoon, 2nd Company, Battalion Zośka battalion, he was killed in the Warsaw's Old Town on 30 August 1944, during the Warsaw Uprising.

1914 births
1944 deaths
Military personnel from Metz
Warsaw Uprising
French soldiers
Home Army members
French military personnel killed in World War II
Warsaw Uprising insurgents
Polish military personnel killed in World War II
People from Alsace-Lorraine
Resistance members killed by Nazi Germany